Mount Pinchot is located in the Lewis Range, Glacier National Park in the U.S. state of Montana. Mount Pinchot is less than  SSE of Mount Stimson while Beaver Woman Lake is southeast of Mount Pinchot.

Mount Pinchot is named for Gifford Pinchot, pioneering forester and past Chief of United States Forest Service, which he helped organize.  The name, Mount Pinchot, was officially approved by the United States Geographic Board on March 6, 1929.

See also
Mountains and mountain ranges of Glacier National Park (U.S.)
Beaver Woman Lake
Buffalo Woman Lake

References

Mountains of Flathead County, Montana
Mountains of Glacier National Park (U.S.)
Lewis Range
Mountains of Montana